Qaravəlili (also, Qarəvəlli and Karavelli) is a village and municipality in the Imishli Rayon of Azerbaijan.  It has a population of 942.

References 

Populated places in Imishli District